Nepal Janahit Party (Nepal Welfare Party), a minor right-wing monarchist party in Nepal.

Political parties in Nepal